Melissa Juratowitch, known professionally as Liss Juratowitch, is an Australian model, best known for being the winner of cycle 8 of Australia's Next Top Model.

Career
As winner of Australia's Next Top Model, Cycle 8, Juratowitch appeared on the cover of Harper's Bazaar Australia in November 2013. The winner's prizes also included a one-year modelling contract with IMG Sydney and worldwide representation by IMG London, New York, Milan and Paris, as well as a A$20,000 cash prize thanks to TRESemmé, a Nissan Dualis and an overseas trip to Paris to meet with IMG Paris.

In 2015, Juratowitch appeared in editorials for magazines including Oyster, Nylon Singapore, Nüyou and Her World and graced the cover of Style:. In April 2019, Juratowitch appeared in an editorial for L'Officiel Vietnam.

References

External links 

Living people
Australian female models
Australia's Next Top Model winners
People from Melbourne
1997 births